Oakfield may refer to:

Places

United Kingdom
 Oakfield, Hertfordshire, in the List of United Kingdom locations: Oa-Od
 Oakfield, Isle of Wight
 Oakfield, Wales, in the List of United Kingdom locations: Oa-Od
 Oakfield, Wolverhampton, in the List of areas in Wolverhampton
 Oakfield, County Fermanagh, in the List of townlands in County Fermanagh, Northern Ireland

United States
 Oakfield, Georgia
 Oakfield, Iowa
 Oakfield, Maine, a New England town
 Oakfield (CDP), Maine, the village in the town
 Oakfield Township, Michigan
 Oakfield (town), New York
 Oakfield (village), New York
 Oakfield, Ohio, an unincorporated community
 Oakfield (town), Wisconsin
 Oakfield, Wisconsin, a village

Elsewhere
 Oakfield, Nova Scotia, Canada

Schools
 Oakfield High School (disambiguation)

England
 Oakfield School (Swindon), Wiltshire
 Oakfield Park School, Ackworth, West Yorkshire
 Oakfield Preparatory School, Dulwich, London
 Oakfield High School and College, Hindley, Wigan

Other uses
 Oakfield; or, Fellowship in the East, an 1853 novel by William Arnold